Arrow Valley Country Park (also known as Arrow Valley Park) is a country park on the River Arrow, at Redditch, Worcestershire, England.

Built by Redditch Development Corporation in the 1970s. It has  of public open space and incorporates the  Arrow Valley Lake, popular for dinghy sailing, fishing and birdwatching. The lake is home to Redditch Sailing Club (racing up to  boats) and the Youth Afloat initiative, which provides sailing experience for children would not otherwise have the opportunity. The park was recognised with a Civic Trust Green Flag Award in 2005. A visitor centre, the Countryside Centre (access off the B4497, Battens Drive) was opened in 2000 and is open most days.

External links
The Countryside Centre at AVCP

Country parks in Worcestershire